The Nishnabotna River is a tributary of the Missouri River in southwestern Iowa, northwestern Missouri and southeastern Nebraska in the United States. It flows for most of its length as two parallel streams in Iowa, the East Nishnabotna River and the West Nishnabotna River.

Several sections of the rivers' courses have been straightened and heavily channelized.

The name "Nishnabotna" comes from an Otoe (Chiwere) word meaning "canoe-making river."

Course

East Nishnabotna River
 
The East Nishnabotna rises in southwestern Carroll County and flows generally south-southwestwardly through Audubon, Cass, Pottawattamie, Montgomery, Page and Fremont Counties, past the towns of Exira, Brayton, Atlantic, Lewis, Elliott, Shenandoah, Red Oak and Riverton. At Red Oak, the river's average discharge is 506 cubic feet per second.

West Nishnabotna River
The West Nishnabotna River rises in southwestern Carroll County and also flows generally south-southwestwardly through Crawford, Shelby, Pottawattamie, Mills and Fremont Counties, past the towns of Manning, Irwin, Kirkman, Harlan, Avoca, Hancock, Oakland and Carson.  At Harlan it collects the West Fork West Nishnabotna River, which rises in southwestern Carroll County and flows southwestwardly through Crawford and Shelby Counties, past Manilla and Defiance.  Near Avoca it collects the East Branch West Nishnabotna River, which rises in southwestern Carroll County and flows southwestwardly through Audubon, Shelby and Pottawattamie Counties, past Gray.  The West Nishnabotna was the topic of a humorous song "Four Wheel Drive" on the 1975 C.W. McCall album Wolf Creek Pass. At Randolph, Iowa, the river averages 747 cubic feet per second.

Lower river

The East and West rivers merge in southwestern Fremont County and continue as the Nishnabotna River for its short course past Hamburg and into northwestern Atchison County, Missouri, where it flows into the Missouri River 2 mi (3 km) west of Watson.

In the last mile of the river it flows from Missouri to Nebraska and back to Missouri before entering the Missouri river in west central Atchison County, MO. This is because an 1867 flood straightened a bend in the Missouri and caused the Nishnabotna to flow about two miles further to reach the Missouri.  The Nishnabotna forms roughly the southeastern border of the 5,000 acre McKissick Island which was the land Nebraska and Missouri both claimed.  The Supreme Court in 1904 officially drew the border with Nebraska getting the land although it is east of Nebraska's normal eastern border which is the river. At Hamburg, the river has a mean annual discharge of 1,441 cubic feet per second.

Recreation
Parks along the river include Botna Bend in Hancock, Willow Slough Wildlife Management Area 3 miles southwest of Henderson, and Riverton Wildlife Management Area, just north of Riverton.  Canoe rentals are available at Botna Bend.  The best paddling is between Hancock and Carson on the west fork and between Lewis and Griswold on the east fork (see "Paddling Iowa" by Nate Hoogeveen).  The Wabash Trace Nature Trail crosses both forks.  At its crossing of the west fork one can see the wreckage of a freight train that derailed and went into the drink in the 1960s.

Variant names
According to the Geographic Names Information System, the river has also been known as:

Other literature sources cite many of the above name in addition to:

See also
List of Iowa rivers
List of Missouri rivers
List of Nebraska rivers
Mormon Trail

Sources

Columbia Gazetteer of North America entry
DeLorme (1998).  Iowa Atlas & Gazetteer.  Yarmouth, Maine: DeLorme.  .
DeLorme (2002).  Missouri Atlas & Gazetteer.  Yarmouth, Maine: DeLorme.  .
The Origin of Certain Place Names of the United States

Rivers of Iowa
Rivers of Missouri
Rivers of Nebraska
Tributaries of the Missouri River
Rivers of Otoe County, Nebraska
Rivers of Nemaha County, Nebraska
Rivers of Carroll County, Iowa
Rivers of Audubon County, Iowa
Rivers of Cass County, Iowa
Rivers of Pottawattamie County, Iowa
Rivers of Montgomery County, Iowa
Rivers of Page County, Iowa
Rivers of Fremont County, Iowa